Dausa District is a district of Rajasthan state in India within Jaipur division. The city of Dausa is the district headquarters. It has an area of 3432 km² and a population of 1,634,409 in 2011 census. It is surrounded by Alwar District in the north, Bharatpur district in the northeast, Karauli district in the southeast, Sawai Madhopur district in the south, and Jaipur district in the west. Dausa district is divided into eight tehsils - Baswa, Dausa, Lalsot, Mahwa, Sikrai, Lawan, Nangal Rajawatan and Ramgarh Panchwara, bejupada, mandawar, Rahuwas. The Sawa and Ban Ganga rivers run through the district. It is situated on the National Highway 21 from Jaipur to Agra. It is 55 km to the east of Jaipur and 103 km from Sawai Madhopur.

History

Dausa is named after a hill near the city that was called Devgiri. On the top of hill is situated a fort.

When Akbar went to Ajmer as a pilgrim to Khwaja Moinuddin Chisti in 1562, he stayed in Dausa and met with Rupsi Baragi, Hakim of Dausa at the time and brother of Bharmal. Agriculture is the main occupation of the people of Dausa. The main crops of the district are wheat, bajra, rapeseed, mustard and groundnuts.

Dausa District was constituted on 10 April 1991 by separating four tehsils, namely Dausa, Baswa, Sikrai, & Lalsot from Jaipur district. Mahwa Tehsil of Sawai Madhopur was included in this district on 15 August 1992.

Demographics

According to the 2011 census Dausa district has a population of 1,634,409, with a population density of 476 persons per km², roughly equal to the nation of Guinea-Bissau or the US state of Idaho. This gives it a ranking of 305th in India (out of a total of 640). Its population growth rate over the decade 2001-2011 was 24.31%. Dausa has a sex ratio of 905 females for every 1000 males, and a literacy rate of 68.16%, with male literacy at 82.98% and female literacy at 51.93%. 12.35% of the population lives in urban areas. Scheduled Castes and Scheduled Tribes make up 21.68% and 26.51% of the population respectively.

At the time of the 2011 Census of India, 86.77% of the population in the district spoke Hindi, 6.64% Dhundari and 6.40% Rajasthani as their first language. The dialect of the region is Dhundari.

Village Baijwadi 
 

Khawaraoji

References

External links

 Official website
 Dausa district on Rajasthan govt page

 
Districts of Rajasthan
Districts in Jaipur division